Ellie Reed is an American actress who has worked primarily in theatre and television. She is known for playing the best friend of the main character in the Netflix series Girlboss.

Early life
Reed was born in Deerfield, Illinois. She graduated from Northwestern University, and further studied improv programs at The Second City Conservatory and iO Theater in Chicago, Illinois.

Theatre career
Reed joined the Griffin Theatre (Chicago) in 2011 and starred in the productions "No More Dead Dogs," "Letters Home," and "Men Should Weep." She was also involved in the founding of and was casting director of the Buzz22 theatre company in Chicago, where she starred in "Hooters: A Play" and "Quake," as well as "She Kills Monsters" which was part of Steppenwolf Theatre Garage Rep's 2013 production.

Her play The Beecher Sisters had its premiere at Chicago’s Awkward Pause Theatre in 2015.

Film and television career
Reed made her debut screen appearance in the short film Positive Comment in 2010 and went on to appear in three episodes of Touch 'n Dix  in 2012. Since then she has appeared in such TV series as Betrayal, Chicago P.D., Empire, Future You, and 2 Broke Girls.

Reed landed a main supporting role as Annie, the best friend of Sophia played by Britt Robertson in Girlboss for 13 episodes in 2017. In 2018, Reed played Sarah Green in the pilot episode of the 2018 ABC reboot of The Greatest American Hero.
 
In 2019, Reed played the leading role in the film Big House, which was due to have its world premiere at the RiverRun International Film Festival in April 2020. 

In 2020 she had a brief cameo in the Brooklyn Nine-Nine episode as Kayla in the episode Lights Out, and starred as Camilla’s girlfriend in 
CBS/Disney+ series Diary of a Future President.

Filmography

Film

Television

Theatre productions

Awards and nominations

References

External links

Ellie Reed on Box Angeles

1988 births
Living people
Actresses from Illinois
21st-century American actresses
People from Deerfield, Illinois
Northwestern University alumni